Hsu Huei-ying (born 20 March 1969) is a Taiwanese athlete. She competed in the women's heptathlon at the 1988 Summer Olympics.

References

1969 births
Living people
Athletes (track and field) at the 1988 Summer Olympics
Taiwanese heptathletes
Olympic athletes of Taiwan
Place of birth missing (living people)